In representation theory, a branch of mathematics, Engel's theorem states that a finite-dimensional Lie algebra  is a nilpotent Lie algebra if and only if for each , the adjoint map

It is a consequence of the theorem, also called Engel's theorem, which says that if a Lie algebra of matrices consists of nilpotent matrices, then the matrices can all be simultaneously brought to a strictly upper triangular form. Note that if we merely have a Lie algebra of matrices which is nilpotent as a Lie algebra, then this conclusion does not follow (i.e. the naïve replacement in Lie's theorem of "solvable" with "nilpotent", and "upper triangular" with "strictly upper triangular", is false; this already fails for the one-dimensional Lie subalgebra of scalar matrices).

The theorem is named after the mathematician Friedrich Engel, who sketched a proof of it in a letter to Wilhelm Killing dated 20 July 1890 .

Statements 
Let  be the Lie algebra of the endomorphisms of a finite-dimensional vector space V and  a subalgebra. Then Engel's theorem states the following are equivalent:
 Each  is a nilpotent endomorphism on V.

Note that no assumption on the underlying base field is required.

We note that Statement 2. for various  and V is equivalent to the statement
For each nonzero finite-dimensional vector space V and a subalgebra , there exists a nonzero vector v in V such that  for every 

This is the form of the theorem proven in #Proof. (This statement is trivially equivalent to Statement 2 since it allows one to inductively construct a flag with the required property.)

Then Engel's theorem implies the following theorem (also called Engel's theorem): when  has finite dimension,
 is nilpotent if and only if  is nilpotent for each .
Indeed, if  consists of nilpotent operators, then by 1.  2. applied to the algebra , there exists a flag  such that . Since , this implies  is nilpotent. (The converse follows straightforwardly from the definition.)

Proof 

(Note the structure of the proof is very similar to that for Lie's theorem, which concerns a solvable algebra.)

This is the most difficult step. We claim it is an ideal of codimension one. Hence, by maximality, . This proves the claim.

Step 2: Let . Then  stabilizes W; i.e.,  for each .

Thus,  is in W.

Write  where L is a one-dimensional vector subspace. Let Y be a nonzero vector in L and v a nonzero vector in W. Now,  is a nilpotent endomorphism (by hypothesis) and so  for some k. Then  is a required vector as the vector lies in W by Step 2.

See also 
 Lie's theorem
 Heisenberg group

Notes

Citations

Works cited

Representation theory of Lie algebras
Theorems in representation theory